Bernsdorf may refer to places in Germany and the Czech Republic:

Germany
Bernsdorf, Bautzen, in the district of Bautzen, Saxony
Bernsdorf, Zwickau, in the district of Zwickau, Saxony

Czech Republic
 Bernsdorf (bei Trautenau), (historical name of) Bernartice (Trutnov District), in Trutnov District
 Bernsdorf, (historical name of) Bernartice nad Odrou in Nový Jičín District